Thomas Francis McNamara, RIAI, RIBA, (1867–1947) was an Irish Roman Catholic ecclesiastical architect active throughout the late-nineteenth- to the mid-twentieth-century Ireland who designed many hospitals and Roman Catholic churches. He was a pupil and later managing assistant of William Hague Jr., partner of the architectural firms Hague and McNamara and, later, T. F. McNamara. He was father of architects N.P. McNamara and Charles G. McNamara, who were partners in his firm from the 1920s, the latter absorbed his practice into his own.

At the office of William Hague, an architect who designed many Roman Catholic churches generally in the French Gothic style, McNamara rose from being a pupil to managing assistant. Hague died 1899, the year Omagh’s Sacred Heart was dedicated and consequently it was "a culmination of [Hague's] amazing catalogue of completed ecclesiastical designs and his continuous championship of the Gothic Revival style," according to Richard Oram in Expressions of Faith-Ulster’s Church Heritage. Following his death, his partner T. F. McNamara took over most of his commissions. Thereafter, Hague "formed a business partnership with Hague's widow, practising as Hague & McNamara until about 1907" when he practised under his own name, the firm of T. F. McNamara, which ventured more into Hispano-Romanesque architecture. His office was located at Dawson Street, Dublin until 1911 and at number 50, and number 5 from 1927 until his death; working at 192 Great Brunswick Street, Dublin from 1911 to 1927.

In 1912, he was appointed architect to the Dublin Joint Hospital Board.

Works
 Sacred Heart Roman Catholic Church, Omagh (1892-1899), designed in the French Gothic style and built by the Colhoun Brothers of Derry at the contract price of £46,000.
County Hospital at Mullingar, begun in 1933.
St Eunan's College, Letterkenny, County Donegal.
Crooksling Sanatorium, Brittas, County Dublin.

References

1867 births
1947 deaths
Architects of Roman Catholic churches
Irish architects
Irish ecclesiastical architects
People associated with St Eunan's College
People from County Dublin